Vigne Glacier is a glacier in Gilgit–Baltistan, Pakistan near Gondogoro Glacier and Baltoro Glacier. It provides access to Gondogoro (La) Pass.

History 
The glacier is named after Godfrey Vigne (1801-1863), an early British traveler in Kashmir and Baltistan.

See also
Baltoro Glacier
Gondogoro Glacier
Gondogoro Pass
List of mountains in Pakistan
List of highest mountains
List of glaciers
Tourism in Pakistan

References

External links
 Northern Pakistan detailed placemarks in Google Earth

Glaciers of Gilgit-Baltistan